USS Marjorie M. (SP-1080) was a United States Navy patrol vessel in commission from 1917 to 1918.

Marjorie M. was built as a private "runabout"-type motorboat of the same name in 1912 by Gottshalk at Philadelphia, Pennsylvania. On 18 August 1917, the U.S. Navy acquired her under a free lease from her owner, A. P. Dennis, for use as a section patrol boat during World War I. She was commissioned the same day as USS Marjorie M. (SP-1080).

Assigned to the 9th Naval District, Marjorie M. served on patrol duty on the Great Lakes through the end of World War I.

The Navy returned Marjorie M. to Dennis on 23 November 1918.

References

Department of the Navy Naval History and Heritage Command Online Library of Selected Images: Civilian Ships: Marjorie M. (Motor Boat, 1912). Served as USS Marjorie M. (SP-1080) in 1917-18
NavSource Online: Section Patrol Craft Photo Archive Marjorie M. (SP 1080)

Patrol vessels of the United States Navy
World War I patrol vessels of the United States
Ships built in Philadelphia
1912 ships
Great Lakes ships